These are the official results of the Women's Javelin Throw event at the 1993 World Championships in Stuttgart, Germany. There were a total number of 31 participating athletes, with the final held on Sunday August 22, 1993. All results were made with a rough surfaced javelin. The qualification mark was set at 62.00 metres.

Medalists

Schedule
All times are Central European Time (UTC+1)

Abbreviations
All results shown are in metres

Records

Qualification

Group A

Group B

Final

See also
 1992 Women's Olympic Javelin Throw

References
 Results
 IAAF

J
Javelin throw at the World Athletics Championships
1993 in women's athletics